Staverton is a rural locality in the local government area (LGA) of Kentish in the North-west and west LGA region of Tasmania. The 2016 census recorded a population of 88 for the state suburb of Staverton.

History 
Staverton was gazetted as a locality in 1965.

Geography
The Forth River forms the western boundary.

Road infrastructure 
Route C140 (Staverton Road) runs through from north to south.

References

Towns in Tasmania
Localities of Kentish Council